Friendly Bacteria is the fifth studio album by the British musician and DJ Mr. Scruff. It was released on 19 May 2014 by the labels Ninja Tune/Ninja Tuna simultaneously.

Background
According to Mr. Scruff, the album would "display a stripped-back musicality, a depth that maybe hasn't been there before", and musically it would be "tougher, sparser, [with] less samples, more bass. More vocals and collaborations and shorter tunes".

On 28 February 2014, "Render Me", a song that would ultimately be featured in the album, was streamed on YouTube via Mr. Scruff's official channel.

Track listing

Personnel
 Mr. Scruff (Andrew Carthy) — all instruments, production
 Denis Jones — vocals (1, 2, 4, 11)
 Vanessa Freeman — vocals (6)
 Robert Owens — vocals (8)

References

External links
 Friendly Bacteria at Ninja Tune
 Mr. Scruff's official website

2014 albums
Mr. Scruff albums
Ninja Tune albums